Ross Watson (born in Brisbane, Australia in 1962) is an artist.  He has exhibited in many solo and group exhibitions since 1984, including important surveys of Australian and international contemporary art at the National Gallery of Australia, the National Gallery of Victoria, and in the Toronto and Melbourne International Art Fairs.  He has been described as a 'proud, gay man', and sexuality has inspired several of his works.

Ross's work includes portraits of Australian former rugby league footballer Ian Roberts, and Olympic Champion Matthew Mitcham

In 2012, Ross celebrated 25 years as a professional artist. His art is included in the collections of the National Gallery of Australia, National Gallery of Victoria, National Portrait Gallery, and significant private collections including Sir Elton John, James J. O'Donnell and James D, Wolfensohn.  He also did free work in aid of the AIDS charity, the Terence Higgins Trust

The internationally released book which includes an interview with the artist by former High Court Justice, the Hon. Michael Kirby, is published by Bruno Gmünder Verlag Germany.

Works published, shown, sold

Written

Notable Collections
National Gallery of Australia, Canberra, Australia
National Gallery of Victoria, Melbourne, Australia
National Portrait Gallery, Canberra, Australia
Sir Elton John Collection, United Kingdom
James J. O'Donnell Collection, New York, USA
Sir William Dobell Foundation, Sydney, Australia
Charles Cholmondeley, London, United Kingdom
Robert Woolley, Sotheby's New York, USA
Allens Arthur Robinson, Sydney, Australia
Citibank, Sydney, Australia
The Von Engelhardt Collection, Geneva, Switzerland
Sir James D. Wolfensohn, President, The World Bank 1995-2005, Washington DC, USA
Abbott Tout Russell Kennedy, Sydney, Australia
Pancontinental, Sydney, Australia 
Dave Clark Collection, London, United Kingdom
Ian Roberts Collection, Sydney, Australia
Grant Hackett, Gold Coast, Queensland, Australia
Professor Andrew Kaye, Melbourne, Australia
Russell Mulcahy, Sydney, Australia
The Hon. Petro Georgiou M.P., Melbourne, Australia
The K. Adams Collection, London, United Kingdom
Dr Brett Archer Collection, Melbourne, Australia
Timothy Chow Collection, New York, USA
Evan Davis Collection, Melbourne, Australia
Dr Simon Terry, Melbourne, Australia
Haydon Elliot and Greg Moses Collection, Melbourne, Australia
Dr Christopher Webber and Christopher Cossier, Sydney, Australia
Michael Trovato Collection, Melbourne, Australia
Sean Angles Collection, San Francisco, USA
Professor Phillip Hamilton RFD, Melbourne, Australia
Paul Zahra and Duncan Peerman, Sydney, Australia
Jon Anderson and Lance Johnson, Palm Springs, USA

External links 
 Ross Watson Homepage

References 

1962 births
Living people
Australian artists